Noureddine Bounâas (born 18 October 1965) is an Algerian footballer. He played in two matches for the Algeria national football team in 1989 and 1990. He was also named in Algeria's squad for the 1990 African Cup of Nations tournament.

References

External links
 

1965 births
Living people
Algerian footballers
Algeria international footballers
1990 African Cup of Nations players
Footballers from Constantine, Algeria
Association football defenders
21st-century Algerian people
MO Constantine players
CS Constantine players
Algerian football managers
CS Constantine managers